The Lockheed Aequare (Latin: "to equalize") was an unmanned aerial vehicle developed by the Lockheed Missiles and Space Company for the United States Air Force. It was intended for launch from an F-4 Phantom II fighter-bomber, and would carry a remote sensor array and laser designator for use by the launching aircraft. The system was evaluated in the mid 1970s, but did not enter operational service.

Design and development
Development of the Aequare was initiated in 1973 with the awarding of a contract from the Defense Advanced Research Projects Agency (DARPA) to the Lockheed Missiles and Space Company for the development of an expendable miniature air-launched remotely piloted vehicle (later known as unmanned aerial vehicle) for use by the United States Air Force (USAF) to find and designate targets for strike aircraft in high-threat environments. Upon deployment of the main parachute, the Aequare would be released, starting its engine and flying under radio command guidance from a ground station, with imagery and telemetry transmitted through a datalink, with the launching aircraft acting as a relay using the CTU-2 datalink pod. The Aequare was equipped with cameras for aerial reconnaissance and also was fitted with a laser designator to allow the launching F-4, or other aircraft, to attack targets found by the UAV.

Operational history
The Aequare first flew in mid-1975; between 15 and 20 prototype aircraft were produced. Following the end of the system's flight trials in March 1976, no production was undertaken.

A development of the Aequare, SAVIOR (Small Aerial Vehicle for Observation, Intelligence, and Reconnaissance), jointly produced by LMSC and Windecker, used the fuselage and engine of Aequare mated to a new fixed wing and landing gear configuration; it was used to research autopilot design and launch-and-recovery techniques for unmanned aerial vehicles.

Specifications

See also

References
Citations

Bibliography

Aequare
1970s United States military reconnaissance aircraft
High-wing aircraft
Single-engined pusher aircraft
Ducted fan-powered aircraft
Tailless aircraft
Unmanned military aircraft of the United States
Windecker aircraft
Aircraft first flown in 1975